Iambia transversa is a moth of the family Noctuidae first described by Frederic Moore in 1882.

Distribution
It is found in Asia, from India to Japan and in Africa in Nigeria, South Africa and Zimbabwe.

References

Amphipyrinae
Lepidoptera of South Africa
Lepidoptera of Zimbabwe
Moths of Japan
Moths of Sub-Saharan Africa